Michel may refer to:
 Michel (name), a given name or surname of French origin (and list of people with the name)
 Míchel (nickname), a nickname (a list of people with the nickname, mainly Spanish footballers)
 Míchel (footballer, born 1963), Spanish former footballer and manager
 Michel (TV series), a Korean animated series
 German auxiliary cruiser Michel
 Michel catalog, a German-language stamp catalog
 St. Michael's Church, Hamburg or Michel
 S:t Michel, a Finnish town in Southern Savonia, Finland

People 
 Alain Michel (disambiguation), several people
 Ambroise Michel (born 1982), French actor, director and writer.
 André Michel (director), French film director and screenwriter
 André Michel (lawyer), human rights and anti-corruption lawyer and opposition leader in Haiti
 Anette Michel (born 1971), Mexican actress
 Anneliese Michel (1952 - 1976), German Catholic woman undergone exorcism
 Annett Wagner-Michel (born 1955), German Woman International Master 
 Charles Michel (born 1975), Belgian politician
 Christopher Michel (born 1967), American investor, entrepreneur and photographer
 Claude Michel (1738 - 1814), French sculptor in the Rococo style
 Curt Michel (1934 - 2015), American academic and astrophysicist
 Danny Michel (born 1970), Canadian songwriter & producer
 David Michel (1735 - 1805), United Kingdom deputy
 Henri Michel (1947 - 2018), French football player and coach
 James Michel (born 1944), Seychellois politician
 Jaydy Michel (born 1975), Mexican actress and fashion model
 Jean-Louis Michel (born 1945), French oceanographer
 Jessica Michel (born 1982), French dressage rider
 Joffrey Michel (born 1987), French rugby union player
 John B. Michel (1917 - 1964), science fiction author 
 Joseph Edward Michel (1917 - 1961), Ghanaian soldier
 Jules Michel (born 1931), French artist
 Lilia Michel (1026 - 2011),  Mexican television and film actress
 Luis Ernesto Michel (born 1979), Mexican football goalkeeper
 Majid Michel (born 1980), Ghanaian actor
 Mario Michel (born 1960),  Saint Lucian lawyer, politician and judge
 Marken Michel (born 1993), American football wide receiver 
 Martín Michel (disambiguation), several people
 Michel Georges-Michel (1883 - 1985), French painter, journalist, novelist, and translator 
 Milton Scott Michel (1916 - 1992), American crime fiction writer and playwright
 Paul Michel (disambiguation), several people
 Philippe Michel (born 1969), French mathematician
 Pras Michel (born 1972), American rapper, record producer, songwriter and actor
 Robert H. Michel (1923 - 2017), American Republican Party politician
 Serge Michel (born 1988), German boxer
 Sia Michel (born 1967), deputy culture editor of The New York Times
 Sony Michel (born 1995), American football running back
 Thiago Michel Pereira Silva (born 1984), Brazilian professional kickboxer and mixed martial arts (MMA) fighter
 Thomas Michel (born 1955), Professor in Medicine at Harvard Medical School
 Wilhelm Michel (1877 - 1942),  German writer, Georg Büchner Prize in 1925
 Yvon Michel (born 1953), French Canadian boxing promoter

See also
 Michał (disambiguation)
 Michel parameters
 Michelle (disambiguation)
 Saint-Michel (disambiguation)

Surnames of Haitian origin